David or Dave Brown may refer to:

People

Arts and entertainment
 David Brown (British artist), British painter
 David Robertson Brown (1869–1946), Canadian architect
 David Brown (American artist), American visual artist based in Old Saybrook, Connecticut, active since 2004
 Dave Brown (cartoonist) (born 1957), British cartoonist for The Independent in the UK
 David Brown (producer) (1916–2010), American movie producer
 Dave Brown (comedian) (born 1973), British actor and comedian
 David Brown (radio host), American lawyer, radio personality and journalist
 David Jay Brown (born 1961), American writer, interviewer, and consciousness researcher
 David W. Brown, American author

Business
 David Brown (1734–1804), Scottish-Danish merchant and shipowner
 David Brown (entrepreneur) (1904–1993), British entrepreneur (David Brown & Sons, Aston Martin, Vosper Thorneycroft)
 Dave Brown (entrepreneur) (born 1976), American entrepreneur

Music
 David Arthur Brown (born 1967), American vocalist and songwriter
 David Brown (American musician) (1947–2000), American musician, bass player with Santana, 1966–1976
 David Brown (Australian musician) (born 1956), Australian musician, active since 1978
 David Brown (British musician) (born 1987), better known as Boyinaband, YouTube personality and musician
 David Brown (double-bassist), American double-bassist with Rising Appalachia
 David Brown (singer), American Idol contestant in 2005
 David Brown, American guitarist with Billy Joel
 David Brown, vocalist with Canadian band The New Cities
 David Darnell Brown (1981), birth name of Young Buck, American Southern rapper
 David Debrandon Brown (1985), American singer-songwriter known professionally as Lucky Daye

Politics and law
 David Brown (Canadian politician) (born 1990), Ottawa city councillor 
 Dave Brown (Montana politician) (1948–1998), member of the Montana House of Representatives
 Dave Brown (Minnesota politician) (born 1961), member of the Minnesota Senate
 David Brown, mayor of Charlottesville, Virginia in 2004–2008
 David Brown (Massachusetts protester) (1740–1812), convicted of sedition because of his criticism of the United States federal government
 David Brown (police officer) (born 1960), superintendent of the Chicago Police Department since April 2, 2020
 David Paul Brown, convicted kidnapper and child sexual assaulter, who changed his name to Nathaniel Bar-Jonah (1957–2008)

Religion
 David Brown (East India Company chaplain) (1762–1812), English chaplain in Bengal
 David Brown (Free Church of Scotland) (1803–1897), Scottish professor of theology at the University of Aberdeen
 David Brown (bishop) (David Allan Brown, 1922–1982), Bishop of Guildford 1973–1982
 David Brown (theologian) (David William Brown, born 1948), Scottish professor of theology, aesthetics, and culture, University of St. Andrews

Science
 David Alexander Brown (1916–2009), Australian geologist
 Dave Brown (meteorologist) (born 1946), American meteorologist at WMC-TV and former professional wrestling commentator
 David Brown (meteorologist) (born 1959), Australian meteorologist
 David R. Brown (neuroscientist) (born 1964), Australian-born research scientist
 David Brown (geneticist) (born 1968), American geneticist
 David J. Brown (computer scientist) (born 1957), American computer scientist
 David R. Brown (engineer) (1923–2016), American computer scientist
 David F. M. Brown, American physician

Sports

American football
 Dave Brown (cornerback) (1953–2006), NFL cornerback
 Dave Brown (quarterback) (born 1970), NFL quarterback for New York Giants and Arizona Cardinals, 1992–2001

Association football
 Davey Brown (1898–1970), American soccer player
 David Brown (footballer, born 1887) (1887–1970), Scottish striker for numerous clubs
 David Brown (footballer, born 1889) (1889–?), Scottish footballer who played for Tottenham Hotspur and Greenock Morton
 David Brown (footballer, born 1963), defender for Tranmere Rovers
 David Brown (footballer, born 1978), striker who plays for Wrexham Football Club
 David Brown (footballer, born 1989), striker who plays for Bradford Park Avenue
 David C. Brown, English footballer who played for Burnley in 1896–1897

Australian rules football
 David Brown (footballer, born 1946), Australian rules footballer for Geelong
 David Brown (footballer, born 1967), Australian rules footballer for Sydney Swans
 David Brown (footballer, born 1969), Australian rules footballer for Adelaide and Port Adelaide

Cricket
 David Brown (cricketer, born 1900) (1900–1951), Scottish cricketer
 David Brown (Scottish cricketer) (1941–2011), Scottish cricketer
 David J. Brown (cricketer) (born 1942), English Test cricketer
 David W. J. Brown (1942–2021), English cricketer
 David Owen Brown (born 1982), English cricketer

Ice hockey
 Dave Brown (ice hockey) (born 1962), NHL ice hockey right winger
 David Brown (ice hockey) (born 1985), Canadian ice hockey goaltender from Ontario

Rugby league
 Dave Brown (rugby), rugby league and rugby union player in Australia
 Dave Brown (rugby league, born 1913) (1913–1974), Australian rugby league footballer
 Dave Brown (rugby league, born 1940), Australian rugby league footballer of the 1960s
 Dave Brown (rugby league, born 1957), Australian rugby league footballer

Other sports
 Dave Brown (baseball) (1895–?), Negro league baseball player
 Dave Brown (basketball) (1933–2009), former basketball coach
 David Brown (Canadian football) (born 1994), Canadian football offensive lineman
 David Brown (golfer) (1861–1936), Scottish golfer
 David Brown (rower, born 1928) (1928–2004), American rower and Olympic gold medalist
 David Brown (rugby union) (1908–1983), Scottish rugby union player
 David Brown (ski jumper) (born 1965), Canadian ski jumper
 David Edward Brown (1858–?), British rower
 David Brown (parathlete) (born 1992), American Paralympic champion
 Dave Brown (bowls) (1939–2007), Canadian lawn bowler

Other people
 David Brown (musicologist) (1929–2014), English musicologist, Tchaikovsky specialist
 David R. Brown (graphic designer), American graphic designer and academic administrator
 David Brown (pharmacology professor), English professor of pharmacology
 David S. Brown (born 1966), American historian
 David K. Brown (1928–2008), British naval architect, author, and historian
 David Tilden Brown (1823–1889), American psychiatrist
 David Brown (Royal Navy officer) (1927–2005), British admiral
 David M. Brown (1956–2003), American astronaut
 David Brown (Scottish Jew), the first Jew known to have lived in Edinburgh in 1691
 David Brown (translator) (c. 1806–1829), Cherokee translator and clergyman
 Nathaniel Bar-Jonah (born David Paul Brown; 1957–2008), child molester and possible serial killer

Fictional characters
 David Brown (Emmerdale), a fictional character in the British soap opera Emmerdale

Businesses
 David Brown Automotive (founded 2013), a British manufacturer of limited edition automobiles
 David Brown Mini Remastered (2017–present), a city car produced by the British car manufacturer
 David Brown Speedback (2014–present), a grand tourer produced by the British car manufacturer
 David Brown Ltd. (founded 1860), an English engineering company

See also
 David Browne (disambiguation)
 David J. Brown (disambiguation)